Luca is a genus of moths of the family Notodontidae first described by Francis Walker in 1862.

Species
Luca herbida Walker, 1862
Luca yanayacensis Miller, 2011

References

Notodontidae